Carl Pei, or Pei Yu (born September 11, 1989), is a Chinese- Swedish entrepreneur. He co-founded OnePlus along with Pete Lau, in 2013 and was the director of OnePlus Global. He left the firm in October 2020 to start a new hardware venture, called Nothing.

Early life
Pei was born in 1989 in Beijing, China; his family soon moved to the United States, and then to Sweden, where Pei grew up. He pursued a Bachelor of Science degree in 2008 at the Stockholm School of Economics, but he dropped out in 2011 to work full-time in the Chinese smartphone industry.

Career
Pei joined Nokia in 2010, and he worked at the company for three months. After Nokia, the fan website Pei had created about Meizu had caught the attention of that company's Hong Kong branch, and Pei started working in Meizu's marketing team in 2011.  In November, he joined Oppo as its international markets manager, where he worked directly under Pete Lau.

OnePlus
Pei co-founded OnePlus with Pete Lau in Shenzhen, Guangdong in December 2013. Their first device, the OnePlus One, sold close to a million units in 2014, despite a sales target of only 50,000.  In July 2015, Pei presented the OnePlus 2 through a virtual reality video on YouTube. It was claimed to be the first product launch in virtual reality, and it has been viewed over 304,800 times as of August 2022. After the unveiling of the OnePlus 3 in June 2016, Pei claimed it was the company's most popular smartphone, based on the Net Promoter Score.  When asked in November 2016, Pei said the reason for the upgrade after only three months was because they did not want to wait to improve the hardware.  Pei claimed the OnePlus 5 to be their fastest-selling  device to date shortly after its release in June 2017.

Pei oversaw the design and marketing of OnePlus devices until leaving the company in October 2020.

Nothing

Following his departure from OnePlus, Pei announced Nothing on January 27, 2021. According to Pei, Nothing’s mission is to remove barriers between people and technology to create a seamless digital future. The company is based in London and landed a number of notable investors, such as iPod inventor Tony Fadell, Twitch co-founder Kevin Lin, Reddit CEO Steve Huffman, and YouTuber Casey Neistat. On February 25, the company announced Teenage Engineering as founding partners, mainly responsible for the design aesthetic of the brand and its products.

Nothing's first product "ear (1)" was launched on July 27, 2021.

On March 23, 2022, Nothing announced its first smartphone, the "phone (1)" with an anticipated release date of Summer 2022.

Publicity
In July 2015, during an interview by The Wall Street Journal about how OnePlus was created, Pei stated, "...we looked at all the Android phones on the market and there wasn't one phone that was good enough for us ourselves to use." In 2014 and 2015, he told The New York Times and Forbes that "OnePlus wasn’t meant to become a global company at the beginning. The main focus was taking on the Chinese market. ... for the global markets team, we are a bunch of young people without a lot of experience. It was just like an experiment, 'Hey, do the global markets and see what happens. Do whatever you want.' We call our group 'a Shenzhen within our company', or a start-up within a bigger company." and "Very soon our sales outside of China will surpass sales in China."

Awards
In April 2016, Pei was included in the 2016 edition of the Marketing Week Vision 100 list. In January 2016, he was included in the 2016 edition of the Forbes 30 Under 30 list for his influence in the technology industry.  and in 2019, he was included in the 2019 edition of the Fortune Fortune 40 Under 40 list  .

References

External links 

Carl Pei on Twitter

Living people
Businesspeople in telecommunications
Technology business executives
Meizu people
OnePlus people
Nothing Technology people
Chinese emigrants to Sweden
1989 births